Leonid Makarovych Kravchuk (10 January 1934 – 10 May 2022) was a Ukrainian politician and the first president of Ukraine, serving from 5 December 1991 until 19 July 1994. In 1992, he signed the Lisbon Protocol, undertaking to give up Ukraine's nuclear arsenal. He was also the Chairman of the Verkhovna Rada and a People's Deputy of Ukraine serving in the Social Democratic Party of Ukraine (united) faction.

After a political crisis involving the president and the prime minister, Kravchuk resigned from the presidency, but ran for a second term as president in 1994. He was defeated by his former prime minister, Leonid Kuchma, who then served as president for two terms. After his presidency, Kravchuk remained active in Ukrainian politics, serving as a People's Deputy of Ukraine in the Verkhovna Rada and the leader of the parliamentary group of Social Democratic Party of Ukraine (united) from 2002 to 2006.

Early life
Leonid Makarovych Kravchuk was born on 10 January 1934 in the village of Velykyi Zhytyn (Żytyń Wielki) to an ethnic Ukrainian peasant family. At that time the village was part of Poland (Second Polish Republic). It became part of the Ukrainian Soviet Socialist Republic after the Soviet invasion of Poland in 1939 when Kravchuk was a child. His father served in the Polish army during the 1930s, and later he and his wife worked for the local osadniks (Polish colonists). During World War II, Kravchuk's father perished on the front lines.

Kravchuk married a mathematics teacher, Antonina Mykhailivna Mishura, in 1957. First Lady of the United States from 1989 to 1993, Barbara Bush (wife of the 41st President of the United States George H. W. Bush), described Antonina in her memoirs: "She was the nicest young woman, a math teacher with absolutely no interest in politics".

Kravchuk went to a vocational school before studying Marxist political economy at Kyiv University. He graduated at 24 and became a political economy teacher in Chernivtsi, in southwest Ukraine, before entering politics. Kravchuk joined the Communist Party of Ukraine in 1958 and rose through the ranks of the party and of its agitprop department.

Kravchuk took part in the International Visitor Leadership Program, a professional exchange run by the US State Department.

Presidency

Chairman of the Supreme Soviet of the Ukrainian SSR 
He became a member of the Ukrainian Communist Party Bureau in 1989, and on 23 July 1990, became Chairman of the Supreme Soviet of the Ukrainian SSR, becoming the republic's nominal head of state. On 24 October 1990, the monopoly of the Communist Party of Ukraine on power was abolished, and thus, Kravchuk became not only the nominal, but also the actual head of the republic.

After the 19–21 August 1991 Soviet coup attempt, Kravchuk, who did not support the attempt to remove Soviet Union leader Mikhail Gorbachev from power, resigned from the Communist Party.  After the Verkhovna Rada passed the Act of Declaration of Independence of Ukraine on 24 August, the constitution was amended to create the post of President of Ukraine. Before the vote for the Declaration of Independence of Ukraine Kravchuk was instrumental in persuading the communists parliamentary majority to accept the opposition's demands of Ukrainian Independence. Participants in the Belovezha talks said Kravchuk rejected any efforts to keep the Soviet Union going with reforms.

Following the Act of Declaration of Independence Kravchuk was vested with presidential powers, thus becoming both de facto and de jure head of state. Later that year, on 5 December 1991, voters formally elected him president in Ukraine's first presidential election. On the same day, the voters voted overwhelmingly to secede from the Soviet Union—a move which Kravchuk now fully supported. This made Kravchuk the first head of state of independent Ukraine.

President of Ukraine 
On 25 February 1992, as President of Ukraine, Kravchuk, issued Presidential decree 98/92 About the changes in the system of central bodies of executive power of Ukraine.

On 6 May 1992, Kravchuk met George H. W. Bush in the United States and signed an agreement for the full removal of all nuclear tactical weapons from Ukrainian territory by 1 July, and in return obtained a credit line of $110 million to buy U.S. commodities. It led to the signing of the Budapest Memorandum. The document was signed on 5 December 1994 at the summit of the Organization for Security and Cooperation in Europe in Budapest. In it, Ukraine, a nuclear power at that time, voluntarily gave up its nuclear weapons in exchange for security guarantees.

Kravchuk achieved and strengthened the formal sovereignty of the country. He took a pro-European stance, developing relations with the West and signing a cooperation accord with the European Union. The Kravchuk administration was the source for Ukraine's depressing reputation as a champion of corruption and missed opportunities as Kravchuk was cozy with Oligarchs and supported Pro Russian Forces adding to escalation of Ukrainian–Russian tensions and a policy of cooperation with Moscow.

Kravchuk refused to retain the common armed forces and currency inside the Commonwealth of Independent States. On 2 July 1993, the Ukrainian parliament approved the statement; 'Ukraine advocates the creation of an all-embracing international system of universal and all-European security and considers participation [therein] a basic component of its national security'.

Ukraine under Kravchuk welcomed the idea of NATO enlargement. As president, he never opposed the expansion of the Alliance or the possibility of a future Ukrainian membership to NATO. This was reflected in his disdain for military cooperation with Eurasian structures, such as the Tashkent CIS Collective Security Treaty, in favour of European security structures. He said that "the best guarantee to Ukraine's security would be membership to NATO." He repeated his support for an immediate Ukrainian membership to NATO in 1994.

Ukraine and Russia argued over many issues, including how the Soviet Navy's Black Sea Fleet should be divided. In May 1992, Russia's Supreme Soviet voted to declare the Soviet government's 1954 grant of Crimea to Ukraine an illegal act. Ukraine opposed this decision. The status of the Russian Black Sea Fleet's presence in Sevastopol and the Crimea was not resolved by a 20-year lease agreement until 1997, three years after Kravchuk left office.

Under Kravchuk's leadership, Ukraine's economy slumped as corruption linked to privatization of Soviet-era industry thrived. Ukraine's economic woes caused a decline in Kravchuk's political popularity, sparking governmental infighting. Political tension reached a point in the fall of 1993 that the then-prime minister, Leonid Kuchma, resigned. By 1994, in less than three years of Kravchuk's presidency, the country's GDP had shrunk by 40 percent.

Kravchuk ran for a second term as president in 1994 but was defeated by his former Prime Minister Leonid Kuchma, with his loss being attributed to the rampant graft and the stagnant economy.

Post-presidency 
Soon after his defeat in 1994, Kravchuk joined the Social Democratic Party of Ukraine (united) (SDPU(o)). He served as a member of the Verkhovna Rada from 1994 until 2006.

In February 2003, Oleksandr Moroz, the leader of Ukraine's Socialist Party, accused Kravchuk and other 300 public high-ranked officials of being members of the Freemasons.

During the 2004 presidential elections Kravchuk actively supported the candidacy of Viktor Yanukovych, and was a member of the Yanukovych team that negotiated with the opposition in the aftermath of that disputed election. In November 2004 he told the media that he was afraid that the resulting crisis would cause the disintegration of the country, intensifying movements for certain regions of Ukraine to join other countries.

On 25 September 2009, Kravchuk declared during an interview with the newspaper Den that he left SDPU(o) and became unaffiliated again. He explained this based on the fact that his former party decided to join the Bloc of Left and Center-left Forces to run for the 2010 presidential elections. He was indignant due to the fact that the political council of the party decided to accomplish that behind the closed doors in non-democratic order. He called it [the] "block as the artificial union without any perspectives". Kravchuk endorsed Yulia Tymoshenko during the 2010 presidential elections campaign.

During the 2010 election campaign, he accused incumbent president Viktor Yushchenko of having "turned into Yanukovych's aide. He has actually turned into an also-ran. His task is to slander Yulia Tymoshenko every day and prevent her from winning [the presidential elections]". Kravchuk explained his shift in support from Yanukovych to Tymoshenko was caused because he felt Yanukovych "turned his back" on all the issues Kravchuk wanted him to address as president: the Ukrainian language, culture, and the Holodomor. "Only the dead or the stupid do not change their views", he stated in December 2009 when he also voiced the opinion that voting for Yanukovych in the second round of the 2010 elections would indicate an anti-Ukrainian position.

In July 2020, Kravchuk was chosen to represent Ukraine at the Trilateral Contact Group (formed to facilitate a diplomatic resolution to the war in the Donbass region), being appointed to replace Leonid Kuchma. He maintained this position until February 2022 when Russia invaded Ukraine.

Death and funeral 
Kravchuk had heart surgery in June 2021. He was reportedly in ill health by this time. On 29 June 2021, the first president of Ukraine missed the solemn meeting of the Verkhovna Rada on the occasion of Constitution Day due to heart surgery. After surgery, the head of the Trilateral Contact Group was placed in intensive care and connected to a ventilator. In July, the media reported that Leonid Kravchuk had been in intensive care for a month.

On 10 May 2022, a family member told the Ukrainian News Agency that Kravchuk had died at the age of 88 in Germany, after a long illness. His death was also confirmed by unnamed officials in Kyiv, as well as Andriy Yermak, head of Ukrainian President Volodymyr Zelenskyy's office. He died a week after Stanislav Shushkevich, another signatory to the Belovezh Accords, died in Minsk. On 11 May, President Zelenskyy issued a decree establishing the Kravchuk Prize in his memory.

His funeral ceremony took place on 17 May at the Ukrainian House in Kyiv, and was attended by President Zelenskyy and First Lady Olena Zelenska as well as three former presidents of Ukraine: Leonid Kuchma, Viktor Yushchenko, and Petro Poroshenko. In addition, guests included his wife Antonina, Mayor Vitali Klitschko of Kyiv, Defence Minister Oleksii Reznikov, and former politicians Oleksandr Kuzmuk, Oleksandr Moroz, and Mustafa Dzhemilev. He was buried at Baikove Cemetery.

Personal life 
Kravchuk was married to Antonina Mykhailivna Kravchuk. The couple married in 1957. She rarely attended official events with her husband.

Kravchuk and his wife had one child, Oleksandr Leonidovych Kravchuk (born 1959), president of the State Company "Nafkom-Ahro" and the former FC Nafkom Brovary. Kravchuk had two grandchildren and one great-granddaughter. After Kravchuk stopped working for the Ukrainian state, he lived in a state-owned dacha in Koncha-Zaspa.

Awards and honors
:
 Hero of Ukraine (21 August 2001)
 Honorary Diploma of the Cabinet of Ministers of Ukraine (2004)
 Order of Prince Yaroslav the Wise (1st, 2nd and 3rd classes) (15 July 2020, 9 January 2007 and 10 January 2004)
 Order of Prince Yaroslav the Wise (4th and 5th classes) (10 January 1999 and 21 August 1996)
 Order of Liberty (10 January 2014)
 Medal of 25 Years of Ukrainian Independence (19 August 2016)
Medal for the Glory of Chernivtsi
Winner of the Ukrainian Celebrity Awards 2020 in the category "Man of the Year"
Honorary Doctorate from Taras Shevchenko National University of Kyiv

:
 Order of the October Revolution 
 Order of the Red Banner of Labour, twice

Legacy 
He is often associated as a key figure in achieving Ukraine's independence and in giving up Ukraine's nuclear arsenal.

Former Belarusian leader, Stanislav Shushkevich, who took part in the Belovezha talks and signed the deal, said; "Kravchuk was focused on Ukraine's independence, he was proud that Ukraine declared its independence in a referendum and he was elected president on 1 December 1991." Following his death, Ukrainian Minister of Defense, Oleksii Reznikov, said, "Thank you for the peaceful renewal of our Independence. We're defending it now with weapons in our hands." Head of the Office of the President of Ukraine, Andriy Yermak, said it was "Sad news and a great loss," describing Kravchuk as "a wise patriot of Ukraine, a truly historical figure in gaining our independence." Ukrainian President Volodymyr Zelenskyy paid tribute to Kravchuk, calling him not just a historical figure but "a man who knew how to find wise words and to say them so that all Ukrainians would hear them."

References

External links
 

 

 
1934 births
2022 deaths
Leonid
People from Rivne Oblast
People from Wołyń Voivodeship (1921–1939)
Presidents of Ukraine
Soviet leaders of Ukraine
Chairmen of the Verkhovna Rada of the Ukrainian Soviet Socialist Republic
Politicians of the Ukrainian Soviet Socialist Republic
Social Democratic Party of Ukraine (united) politicians
Independent politicians in Ukraine
Communist Party of Ukraine (Soviet Union) politicians
Soviet propagandists
People of the Revolution on Granite
Candidates in the 1991 Ukrainian presidential election
Candidates in the 1994 Ukrainian presidential election
Ukrainians in Poland
Burials at Baikove Cemetery
Taras Shevchenko National University of Kyiv alumni
Recipients of the title of Hero of Ukraine
Recipients of the Order of Prince Yaroslav the Wise, 1st class
Recipients of the Order of Prince Yaroslav the Wise, 2nd class
Recipients of the Order of Prince Yaroslav the Wise, 3rd class
Recipients of the Order of Prince Yaroslav the Wise, 4th class
Recipients of the Order of Prince Yaroslav the Wise, 5th class
Recipients of the Honorary Diploma of the Cabinet of Ministers of Ukraine
Recipients of the Order of the Red Banner of Labour
20th-century Ukrainian politicians
21st-century Ukrainian politicians